Stukes is a surname. Notable people with the surname include:

Charlie Stukes (born 1943), American football defensive back
Dwayne Stukes (born 1977), American football coach and former defensive back
Melvin L. Stukes (born 1948), American politician
Taylor Hudnall Stukes, American judge